Dinesh B. Saparamadu (born December 24, 1965) is the Founder and Chairman of hSenid Group of Companies and PeoplesHR, companies providing enterprise HR and mobile solutions with presence in United States, India, Sri Lanka, Singapore and Australia. He is a key stakeholder in the Information Technology Industry of Sri Lanka and is a founding member and Chairman Emeritus of SLASSCOM. 

Dinesh has over 25 years of experience in the information technology industry. He is a HR thought leader, a speaker and has been a participant for many panel discussions and forums in the fields of SaaS, Human Resources and Information Technology. He is also the recipient of the 2012 ICT Most Outstanding Contribution award from the BCS Sri Lanka section for his contribution to the development of ICT in Sri Lanka. A serial entrepreneur, Dinesh founded more than six companies over the last two decades. He is also involved in the capacity of Director, Executive Committee Member of Chambers of Commerce both locally and internationally in a number of IT organizations.

Dinesh has a Bachelor of Science in Computer Engineering and a Master of Science in Computer Science from University of Bridgeport in Bridgeport, Connecticut, United States. He is an old boy of D.S. Senanayake College, Colombo, Sri Lanka. He began his career with Aetna Life and Casualty, Connecticut, United States; where he worked on Enterprise Technology, and served as an Enterprise Technology Consultant. After Aetna he joined Pepsi Cola, in Somers, New York, as a Software Engineer.

References

Sinhalese businesspeople
1965 births
Living people